Dounie is a small remote scattered hamlet in Sutherland, Scottish Highlands and is in the Scottish council area of Highland. The River Carron runs through Dounie.

References

Populated places in Sutherland